Wahab Wumbei Suhuyini (born 30 September 1955) is a Ghanaian politician and member of the Seventh Parliament of the Fourth Republic of Ghana representing the Tolon Constituency in the Northern Region on the ticket of the New Patriotic Party.

Personal life 
Suhuyini is Muslim. He is married, with six children.

Early life and education
Suhuyini was born on 30 September 1955. He hails from Gburimani, a town in the Northern Region of Ghana. He entered the University of Education, Winneba and obtained his Bachelor of Education degree in Ghanaian Languages in 1997.

Career 
 Vice Principal in-charge of Training, Ghanaian-Danish Community Programme (non-governmental organization), Dalun
 Ghana Education Service Choggu, JSS Tamale

Politics 
Suhuyini is a member of the New Patriotic Party (NPP). In 2012, he contested for the  Tolon seat on the ticket of the NPP sixth parliament of the fourth republic and won.

References

Ghanaian MPs 2017–2021
1955 births
Living people
Ghanaian Muslims
New Patriotic Party politicians